The Auckland green gecko (Naultinus elegans) is a species of gecko found only in the northern half of the North Island of New Zealand, except north of Whangaroa.  The Wellington green gecko, formerly considered a subspecies (together called common green gecko), is found in the southern half of the North Island. The ranges overlap in places through the central North Island and hybrids may occur.  Its length is up to 145 mm, snout to vent.

Apart from range, the Auckland green gecko differs from the Wellington green gecko in that it is marginally smaller and more slender in build and also the undersurfaces of the feet and toes in elegans are coloured grey green, while they are yellow in colouration in the latter species.

Conservation status 
In 2012 the Department of Conservation classified the Auckland green gecko as At Risk under the New Zealand Threat Classification System. It was judged as meeting the criteria for At Risk threat status as a result of it having a low to high ongoing or predicted decline.

See also
List of geckos of New Zealand

References

Naultinus
Reptiles of New Zealand
Reptiles described in 1842
Taxa named by John Edward Gray